Jani Hakanpää (born 31 March 1992) is a Finnish professional ice hockey defenceman for the Dallas Stars of the National Hockey League (NHL). Hakanpää was selected by the St. Louis Blues in the fourth round (104th overall) of the 2010 NHL Entry Draft.

Playing career
Hakanpää played in his native Finland for the Espoo Blues of the SM-liiga during the 2011–12 and 2012–13 seasons.

On 22 May 2012, Hakanpää was signed to a three-year, entry-level contract with draft club, the St. Louis Blues, who had drafted him 104th overall in the 2010 NHL Entry Draft.

After attending the Blues training camp, Hakanpää was returned to the Espoo Blues on loan to begin the 2012–13 season. He contributed with 5 points through 34 games on the blueline in Finland before returning to North America to play out the 2012–13 AHL season with the St. Louis Blues' AHL affiliate, the Peoria Rivermen. He registered one goal and three assists in fourteen games.

At the completion of his entry-level deal with the Blues, Hakanpää opted to return to Finland signing a two-year contract with the Liiga club Oulun Kärpät on 2 July 2015.

In the 2017–18 season, Hakanpää helped Oulun Kärpät claim the Kanada-malja as Finnish champions, enjoying a career season where he posted 6 goals and 24 points in 58 games. He continued to show a developing two-way game with 7 points in 16 playoff appearances.

Hakanpää led Liiga defensemen in Plus/minus in back-to-back seasons and tied for second among league defensemen with a career best 11 goals while compiling 23 points in 52 games for league leading Kärpät in the 2018–19 Liiga season. He featured in 17 playoff contests, registering 4 points as Oulun Kärpät failed to defend the Championship in the finals against HPK.

On 3 July 2019, Hakanpää returned to North America, signing as a free agent to a one-year, $850,000 contract with the Anaheim Ducks.

In his first full season in the NHL, during the pandemic-delayed 2020–21 season, Hakanpää recorded one assist in 42 regular season games, while leading the Ducks and placing third in the league in hits. On 12 April 2021, Hakanpää, and a sixth-round pick in the 2022 NHL Entry Draft, was traded to the Carolina Hurricanes in exchange for Haydn Fleury.

On 29 July 2021, Hakanpää signed a three-year, $4.5 million contract with the Dallas Stars. In the 2021–22 season, Hakanpää had his first multi-point game, and recorded four goals and eight assists for a 12-point season.

Career statistics

Regular season and playoffs

International

Awards & honors

References

External links
 

1992 births
Living people
Anaheim Ducks players
Carolina Hurricanes players
Chicago Wolves players
Dallas Stars players
Espoo Blues players
Finnish expatriate ice hockey players in the United States
Finnish ice hockey defencemen
Oulun Kärpät players
Peoria Rivermen (AHL) players
Quad City Mallards (ECHL) players
St. Louis Blues draft picks
San Diego Gulls (AHL) players
21st-century Finnish people